The Winnipeg Rangers were a Canadian junior hockey team in the Manitoba Junior Hockey League and the second team to use this name. This version of the Rangers won two Turnbull Cups (1961–62 and 1965–66).

The team was founded in 1956, but after one season in Winnipeg, the Rangers moved to Brandon due to lack of ice availability.  Soon after, the team moved to Transcona (now part of Winnipeg).  In 1959, the name changed back to the Winnipeg Rangers.

On March 18, 1966 at the Winnipeg Arena, the Rangers won the Turnbull Memorial Cup as MJHL champs.

Notable Rangers players included Butch Goring, Chuck Lefley, Terry Ball, and Bryan Lefley.

During the summer of 1967, a community-minded sports group purchased the Rangers from Ben Hatskin.  The team was relocated to St. Boniface where they became the St. Boniface Saints.  The franchise exists today as the Virden Oil Capitals.

Season-by-season record
Note: GP = Games Played, W = Wins, L = Losses, T = Ties, OTL = Overtime Losses, GF = Goals for, GA = Goals against

See also
Winnipeg Saints
Virden Oil Capitals

External links
Winnipeg Rangers (1956-1967) season statistics and records at The Internet Hockey Database

Ice hockey teams in Winnipeg
Defunct Manitoba Junior Hockey League teams